The Little River is a tributary of the St. Francis River, about  long, in southeastern Missouri and northeastern Arkansas in the United States.  Via the St. Francis, it is part of the watershed of the Mississippi River.

The Little River's upper course in Missouri has been greatly altered by channelization practices. It originally collected the waters of the Castor and Whitewater rivers, but these streams' outlets have been diverted to the Mississippi River by the Headwater Diversion Channel and other drainage systems, and the Little River's course through the Missouri Bootheel has been diverted to a canal, though traces of its original course still exist. In Arkansas the river passes through the Big Lake National Wildlife Refuge and the left hand channelized chute of the river joins the St. Francis River at Marked Tree.

Little River most likely derives its name via French La Petitie Riviere on account of its small size relative to other nearby rivers.

See also
List of Arkansas rivers
List of Missouri rivers

References

Columbia Gazetteer of North America entry
DeLorme (2004).  Arkansas Atlas & Gazetteer.  Yarmouth, Maine: DeLorme.  .
DeLorme (2002).  Missouri Atlas & Gazetteer.  Yarmouth, Maine: DeLorme.  .

External links
Big Lake National Wildlife Refuge website

Rivers of Arkansas
Rivers of Missouri
Tributaries of the Mississippi River
Bodies of water of Mississippi County, Arkansas
Rivers of Dunklin County, Missouri
Rivers of New Madrid County, Missouri
Rivers of Pemiscot County, Missouri
Rivers of Scott County, Missouri
Rivers of Stoddard County, Missouri